The Tiyas Military Airbase, also known as the T-4 Air base, is a Syrian Arab Air Force (SyAAF) base located in the Homs Governorate, north of Tiyas, and west of the ancient city of Palmyra, Syria.

The Tiyas Military Airbase is the largest airbase in Syria.

History 

During the 1970s and 1980s, the Soviet Union was given access to the Tiyas Air Base for the periodic deployment of naval aircraft.

Civil war
The airbase was used by the Syrian Arab Air Force and Iran's Quds Force for military operations against ISIL and opposition forces during the Syrian Civil War.

In December 2016, the Islamic State of Iraq and the Levant (ISIL) attacked the airbase a day after overrunning pro-government forces in nearby Palmyra. ISIL claimed to have destroyed four Syrian military aircraft during their attack on the airbase.

The Israeli Air Force launched an attack on the airbase on 10 February 2018, destroying the main observation tower, according to the Syrian Observatory for Human Rights.

The base was struck again on 9 April 2018 by multiple missiles, it was not immediately clear who was behind the attack however U.S officials denied launching any air attack on Syria.

It was reported that the April 2018 attack on the base destroyed a hangar used to shelter drones and an Iranian supplied anti-aircraft Tor missile system, before it could be set up and become fully operational.

T-4 air base has been used by Iran-backed Shia militias to launch drone strikes against U.S. bases in northern Syria during summer 2021.

Israeli warplanes attacked the airbase with the missiles again on 8 October 2021 around 9:30 pm. Six Syrian soldiers were injured according to Syrian media. Israel claims that the airbase is still used by Iranian forces.

Aircraft 
 1 Squadron MiG-25PD/PU/RB
 5 Squadron MiG-25PD/PU/RB
 819 Squadron Su-24MK
 827 Squadron Su-22M-4

See also 
List of Syrian Air Force bases
Shayrat and Tiyas airbase ambush

References

External links
https://www.world-airport-codes.com/syria/tiyas-air-base-74815.html

Syrian Air Force bases
Military installations of Syria
Soviet Naval Aviation bases
Soviet Union–Syria relations